Michael Allen Marshall (born January 12, 1960), nicknamed "Moose" is an American former professional baseball player and current commissioner of the Pacific Association of Professional Baseball Clubs. He also played for the New York Mets, Boston Red Sox and the California Angels. After his major league career, he played one season in Nippon Professional Baseball for the Nippon Ham Fighters in 1992. Marshall served as president and general manager of the Chico Outlaws of the North American League.

Playing career 
Born in Libertyville, Illinois, Marshall showed considerable promise as a minor league player. He had 24 home runs and 22 steals for Class-A Lodi in the Cal League in 1979. He won the league's Triple Crown in 1981, when he hit .373 with 34 homers, 21 stolen bases, and 137 RBIs for the Albuquerque Dukes, a Triple A club in the Pacific Coast League.

He is one of only two LA Dodger minor leaguers to have two 20/20 minor league seasons. (Joc Pederson did it in 2013 and 2014.)

He was elected to the National League All-Star team in 1984. He had perhaps his best season in 1985, when he hit .293 and set career highs with 28 home runs, 95 runs batted in, 72 runs scored, and 267 total bases.

Marshall has two World Series rings from the Dodgers' 1981 and 1988 World Series wins in which he hit a homer in Game 2.

Marshall saw limited action in 2002 with the Independent Northern League Schaumburg Flyers.

Career statistics 

In the postseason, in 26 games, he batted .212 (18-for-85) with 7 runs, 3 home runs and 13 RBI.

Managerial and front office career 
Marshall managed the Albany-Colonie Diamond Dogs of the Northern League from 2000 to 2002 and the El Paso Diablos from 2005 to 2006. He was the field manager, team president, and general manager of the Yuma Scorpions, of the Golden Baseball League from 2007 to 2008. After working as manager and team president of the Chico Outlaws during the 2010 and 2011 seasons, Marshall was named as field manager and vice president of baseball operations for the San Rafael Pacifics club for the 2012 campaign.

Personal life 

Marshall attended Buffalo Grove High School.

Marshall briefly dated Belinda Carlisle of the pop band the Go-Go's.

Marshall and his wife, Mary, and have two children, Michael Allen Marshall Jr. and Marcheta Kay (Marshall) Schroeder; both graduated from Stanford University.

References

External links

Pelota Binaria (Venezuelan Winter League)

 Mike Marshall at SABR (Baseball BioProject)

1960 births
Living people
Albuquerque Dukes players
American expatriate baseball players in Japan
Baseball players from Illinois
Boston Red Sox players
California Angels players
Cardenales de Lara players
American expatriate baseball players in Venezuela
Lethbridge Dodgers players
Lodi Dodgers players
Los Angeles Dodgers players
Major League Baseball first basemen
Major League Baseball left fielders
Major League Baseball right fielders
Minor league baseball managers
National League All-Stars
New York Mets players
Nippon Ham Fighters players
Pacific Coast League MVP award winners
Palm Springs Angels players
Pawtucket Red Sox players
People from Libertyville, Illinois
San Antonio Dodgers players
Schaumburg Flyers players